Olympic Dreams is a 2019 American romance film directed by Jeremy Teicher and written by Alexi Pappas, Jeremy Teicher and Nick Kroll. The film stars Alexi Pappas, Nick Kroll, Gus Kenworthy and Morgan Schild. The film was released on February 14, 2020, by IFC Films.

Cast
Alexi Pappas as Penelope
Nick Kroll as Ezra
Gus Kenworthy as Gus
Morgan Schild as Maggie

Release
The film premiered at South by Southwest on March 10, 2019. On June 17, 2019, IFC Films acquired distribution rights to the film. The film was released on February 14, 2020, by IFC Films.

Reception
The website's consensus reads: "Even if it's mainly distinguished by its unique setting, Olympic Dreams remains a romcom with a heartfelt story and likable leads." On Metacritic, the film has a score of 55 out of 100, based on 12 critics, indicating "mixed or average reviews".

References

External links
 

2019 romance films
2019 films
American romance films
Films about the 2018 Winter Olympics
Films shot in South Korea
IFC Films films
2010s English-language films
2010s American films